John Francis Tumpane (born May 4, 1983) is an American Major League Baseball umpire wearing number 74.

Umpiring career
He made his major league umpiring debut on August 2, 2010. He umpired in six major league games in 2010, and returned in 2011, umpiring in 68 games. On July 1, 2016, Tumpane was promoted to the full-time MLB umpiring staff. 

In August 2015, Dodgers catcher Yasmani Grandal complained about Tumpane’s strike zone, saying "This whole season I’ve been fighting that guy... It's one of those frustrating things where you don't really know what it is he's going to call."  In October 2020, third baseman Josh Donaldson tweeted his opinion that Tumpane was a "Top 3 worst ump in the game," adding "Trust me this guy has no idea what the zone is in the rule book."

Notable games

On August 21, 2015, he was the home plate umpire in Houston for Mike Fiers' no-hitter against the Los Angeles Dodgers. On May 4, 2018, he was the home plate umpire for Walker Buehler, Tony Cingrani, Yimi Garcia, and Adam Liberatore's of the Los Angeles Dodgers combined no-hitter against the San Diego Padres. On August 25, 2020, Tumpane was the second base umpire for a no-hitter thrown by Lucas Giolito of the Chicago White Sox against the Pittsburgh Pirates.

For game 2 of the 2020 American League Championship Series, played on October 12, 2020, Tumpane was credited with a 99.3% correctly called game in which he correctly called as ball or strike 134 of 135 pitches at which a batter did not swing.

On September 27, 2022, Tumpane, serving as first base umpire, called an MLB-record 3 balks on Miami Marlins pitcher Richard Bleier while Bleier was pitching to the same batter; Bleier had never been called for a balk in his MLB career previously, over the course of 303 games in seven seasons. CBS Sports opined: "Some balks are obvious. Those are not... You almost have to be looking for a reason to call a balk to ring Bleier up on that motion three -- again, three! -- times in a single inning."

Personal life
Tumpane is a 2001 graduate of Saint Laurence High School in Burbank, Illinois. On June 28, 2017, Tumpane helped prevent a suicide attempt on the Roberto Clemente Bridge in Pittsburgh, Pennsylvania prior to umpiring a game between the Tampa Bay Rays and the Pittsburgh Pirates.

See also 
 List of Major League Baseball umpires

References

External links

Retrosheet

1983 births
Living people
Major League Baseball umpires
People from Evergreen Park, Illinois
Sportspeople from Illinois